Nanichi is a crater found the Magellian region on the planet Venus.  It measures 19 km in diameter, and is located at +East, 0 - 360 using the planetocentric coordinate system.

Its name is derived from the original Taino language of the Greater Antilles and means "My Love or My Heart". The name, given in 2000 by the International Astronomical Union (IAU) was provided by the Taino leader, Chief Pedro Guanikeyu Torres of the Jatibonicu Taino of Puerto Rico.

See also 
 Geology of Venus
 List of craters on Venus
 Magellan probe

References 

Impact craters on Venus